Nag champa is a fragrance of Indian origin. It is made from a combination of sandalwood and either champak or frangipani. When frangipani is used, the fragrance is usually referred to simply as champa. 

Nag champa is commonly used in incense, soap, perfume oil, essential oils, candles, and personal toiletries. It is a popular and recognizable incense fragrance.

Composition 

A number of flower species in India are known as champa or champak:

 Magnolia champaca, formerly classified as Michelia champaca (swarna champa or yellow champa)
 Plumeria rubra and Plumeria acutifolia (frangipani)
 Mesua ferrea (nagkeshar or nagchampa)

Of these—Magnolia champaca, is mostly used to prepare the nag champa scent, while Plumeria or Mesua ferrea may be used for scents termed champa and sometimes nag champa.

Nag champa perfume ingredients vary with the manufacturer, though generally they include sandalwood and magnolia, which, as the plant is related to star anise, gives the scent a little spice. Other ingredients will depend on the finished product. Perfume-dipped incenses and soaps would use essential oils or scents, while masala incenses would use finely ground fragrant ingredients as well as essential oils.

References

External links
 

Incense material
Incense in India
Perfume ingredients